The Tattooed Girl is a 2003 novel by American writer Joyce Carol Oates.

Plot 
Alma Busch, a 27-year-old woman from Akron, Pennsylvania with mysterious tattoos of unknown origin on her body, arrives in the affluent town of Mount Carmel in upstate New York. She is spotted by a man named Dmitri Meatte, a waiter at "The Café" who become her pimp and boyfriend. Alma meets a novelist named Joshua Seigl, who takes her on as an assistant for his next novel even though she steals and destroys his work and hates him for being Jewish.

Reception 
In a review for The Guardian, author Toby Litt called the novel "a completely gripping tale told in an almost manically propulsive style". Sophie Harrison's review in The New York Times was more critical of its "showy unsqueamishness" and uneven characterization.

References 

2003 American novels
Novels by Joyce Carol Oates
Ecco Press books